Green Hat (also known as The Green Hat) is a Chinese film from 2003 and the debut of screenwriter Liu Fendou. Starring Li Congxi, Liao Fan, and Dong Lifan, the film tells the story of two men, one a bank robber, and one a police officer and their shared problem of unfaithful partners. In China, the phrase "wearing a green hat", refers to a cuckold. The film features full-frontal male nudity.

The film was well received by both critics and festival audiences, notably at the 2004 Tribeca Film Festival where it won a prize for Best Narrative Feature.

Plot 
Wang Yao (Liao Fan) is a criminal. Along with two friends, he prepares one last heist with the plan that he will head to the United States afterward for a reunion with a girlfriend he has not seen in two years. After the successful robbery of a bank, Wang stops at a small grocery store to call his girlfriend, who ceremoniously dumps him. Distraught, Wang takes the grocery store's proprietor hostage when she demands payment for the long-distance phone call. When the police arrives, one of their number (Li Congxi) offers to take the place of the hostage. Wang agrees, and then promptly commits suicide after asking the shocked officer, "What is love?"

The film then shifts its attention to the police officer, who now begins to face the fact that his wife (Li Mei) has been carrying on an affair with a swimming coach (Hai Yitian). Struggling from sexual inadequacy and humiliation, the officer decides to confront his wife and her lover.

Reception 
Green Hat was screened at numerous international film festivals including Tribeca, Seattle, and Thessaloniki.

Western critics were generally positive in their reaction to the film, with the film winning a Best Narrative Feature from Tribeca, and FIPRESCI awarding a best film award to it at the Thessaloniki Film Festival, These critics, such as Variety's Derek Elley, found the film to be a strong debut by Liu and praised the film's visual compositions and unusual sexual frankness.

See also
 List of Chinese films of 2003
 Nudity in film (East Asian cinema since 1929)

References

External links 
 
 Green Hat at the Chinese Movie Database

2004 films
2004 drama films
2000s thriller drama films
Chinese drama films
Films set in Beijing
2000s Mandarin-language films